Filippo Lombardi (born 29 May 1956) is a Swiss politician. He represented Ticino in the Council of States from 2014 to 2019 and served as the President of the Council of States from 2012 to 2013.  He is a member of the Christian Democratic People's Party.

External links 

 

Members of the Council of States (Switzerland)
Presidents of the Council of States (Switzerland)
Christian Democratic People's Party of Switzerland politicians
1956 births
Living people